Aleksandar Kopunović (born 29 February 1976) is a Serbian football manager and former striker.

Playing career

Club
Born in Subotica, SR Serbia, then still part of Yugoslavia, Kopunović started his playing career with his hometown club Spartak Subotica. He then moved abroad to Mura in Slovenia. Between 2001 and 2005, Kopunović played for Kamen Ingrad in Croatia. He also played professionally in China, Hungary, and Greece, and in the summer of 2014, he joined FK Bačka 1901, the oldest club in Serbia, playing in the Serbian League Vojvodina.

At the start of the 1994/95 season, he joined FK Bačka 1901 and played with them in the Second League of FR Yugoslavia group North. In that same club, he finished his playing career in the 2014–15 season playing in the Serbian League Vojvodina.  Beofore that, he had also played with Spartak Subotica, Mura, Kamen Ingrad, Guangzhou Rizhiquan, Mladost Apatin, Kecskemét, Hrvatski Dragovoljac, OFK Petrovac, Anagennisi Epanomi, Kastoria, and Tisa Adorjan.

Managerial career
In the summer of 2015, he finished his playing career and became one of the managers of the youth teams of FK Spartak Subotica.

Career statistics

References

External links
 HLSZ profile
 PrvaLiga profile

1976 births
Living people
Sportspeople from Subotica
Croats of Vojvodina
Association football forwards
Serbia and Montenegro footballers
Serbian footballers
FK Spartak Subotica players
NK Mura players
NK Kamen Ingrad players
Guangzhou F.C. players
FK Mladost Apatin players
Kecskeméti TE players
NK Hrvatski Dragovoljac players
OFK Petrovac players
Anagennisi Epanomi F.C. players
Kastoria F.C. players
FK Bačka 1901 players
First League of Serbia and Montenegro players
Slovenian PrvaLiga players
Croatian Football League players
China League One players
Serbian SuperLiga players
Nemzeti Bajnokság II players
First Football League (Croatia) players
Montenegrin First League players
Gamma Ethniki players
Serbia and Montenegro expatriate footballers
Expatriate footballers in Slovenia
Serbia and Montenegro expatriate sportspeople in Slovenia
Expatriate footballers in Croatia
Serbia and Montenegro expatriate sportspeople in Croatia
Expatriate footballers in China
Serbia and Montenegro expatriate sportspeople in China
Serbian expatriate footballers
Expatriate footballers in Hungary
Serbian expatriate sportspeople in Hungary
Serbian expatriate sportspeople in Croatia
Expatriate footballers in Montenegro
Serbian expatriate sportspeople in Montenegro
Expatriate footballers in Greece
Serbian expatriate sportspeople in Greece
Serbian football managers